Ernest John Groth (December 24, 1884 – May 23, 1950), nicknamed "Dango", was a pitcher in Major League Baseball who played for the 1904 Chicago Cubs.

External links

1884 births
1950 deaths
Major League Baseball pitchers
Baseball players from Wisconsin
Chicago Cubs players
Columbus Senators players
People from Cedarburg, Wisconsin
Sportspeople from the Milwaukee metropolitan area